The UTSA Roadrunners baseball team is the varsity intercollegiate baseball team representing University of Texas at San Antonio in NCAA Division I college baseball. The program is a member the West Division of the Conference USA (CUSA). The program's home venue is Roadrunner Field. The team has appeared in the NCAA Tournament three times, most recently in 2013.

History
UTSA has competed in three conferences since the formation of the team in 1992, Southland Conference (1993-2012), Western Athletic Conference (2013), and now since 2014, Conference USA, winning two conference championships, three conference tournaments, and appearing in the NCAA Tournament three times.

Coaches
Only those who coached 3 or more seasons and 30 or more games.

Yearly Record

References

External links
UTSA Roadrunners Baseball official homepage

 
Baseball teams established in 1992
1992 establishments in Texas